Sar (also Romanized as Sār; also known as Lār and Sāl) is a village in Rudqat Rural District, Sufian District, Shabestar County, East Azerbaijan Province, Iran. At the 2006 census, its population was 1,504, in 371 families.

References 

Hola buenas tardes

Populated places in Shabestar County